David Richard Edwards (January 13, 1938 – January 5, 2013) was an American retired United States Navy officer, businessman, and politician.

Early life 
Edwards was born in Cheyenne, Wyoming.

Education 
Edwards graduated from the Naval Postgraduate School in Monterey, California.

Career

Military 
In the U.S. Navy, Edwards flew more than two hundred combat missions during the Vietnam War. Edwards's military nickname was "Warpaint".

Business 
Edwards bought the LaBonte Hotel, a historical hotel.

Politics 
Edwards moved to Douglas, Wyoming in 1993 and was elected to the city council there. He subsequently served as a commissioner of Converse County. He served in the Wyoming House of Representatives (2001–2008) as the Representative for District 6 as a Republican.

Edwards tendered his letter of resignation on January 6, 2012, to the Converse County Commission after being diagnosed with Alzheimer's disease.
 He officially stepped down February 1.

Personal life 
On December 26, 2012, Edwards suffered a stroke and died on January 5, 2013, eight days short of his 75th birthday.

References

External links 
 Dave Edwards at ballotpedia.org

1938 births
2013 deaths
Politicians from Cheyenne, Wyoming
People from Douglas, Wyoming
Military personnel from Wyoming
Naval Postgraduate School alumni
United States Navy officers
United States Navy personnel of the Vietnam War
Wyoming city council members
Republican Party members of the Wyoming House of Representatives
20th-century American politicians
21st-century American politicians